S. Charuhasan (born 5 January 1931) is an Indian actor, director and retired lawyer who has acted in Tamil, Kannada, Telugu, Malayalam and Hindi films. He won the National Film Award for Best Actor and the Karnataka State Film Award for Best Actor for the Kannada film Tabarana Kathe (1987). Charuhasan is the elder brother of veteran actor Kamal Haasan and father of Indian actress Suhasini.

Early life 

Charuhasan was born on 5 January 1931 to lawyer and Indian independence activist D. Srinivasan and his wife Rajalakshmi. He was the eldest son of the couple and more than twenty-four years older than his youngest brother Kamal Haasan.

Charuhasan had a different schooling to other children his age; due to an accident he was unable to attend school for the first few years of his life and had a private tutor give him a basic education. He was directly admitted to fifth grade at the age of nine. In 1949, Charuhasan joined the Raja Lakhamgouda Law College in Belgaum and qualified as a lawyer in 1951.

Charuhasan practised law from 1951 to 1981. As lawyer, Charuhasan appeared in many high-profile cases, even representing U. Muthuramalingam Thevar in the Immanuvel Sekaran murder case. During this period, he was influenced by the rationalist philosophy of Periyar E. V. Ramasamy. Periyar even referred to Charuhasan as his sishyan (disciple).

In the film industry 

Charuhasan was interested in movies since childhood. During the late 1940s, he used to watch two foreign films a day. When his younger brother, Kamal Hasan, started acting in movies as a child actor, Charuhasan was his caretaker. Charuhasan eventually made his debut in 1979 Tamil film Uthiripookkal directed by Mahendran which was based on a short story by Pudhumaipithan. Since then, he has acted in more than 120 films often playing supporting or antagonistic roles, his most important movies being Vedham Pudhithu, Tabarana Kathe and Thalapathi. He has also directed two films, IPC 215 and Puthiya Sangammam.

Personal life 

Charuhasan is married to Komalam since 1953 and has three daughters Nandhini, Suhasini, and Subhasini. Suhasini is an actress and married to film director Mani Ratnam.

Awards
 1986 – National Film Award for Best Actor for Tabarana Kathe
 1986 – Karnataka State Film Award for Best Actor for Tabarana Kathe
 1992 – Filmfare Award for Best Kannada Actor for Kubi Matthu Iyala

Selected filmography

Kannada

 Tabarana Kathe
 Kubi Matthu Iyala
 Neelambari
 Durga Shakti

Malayalam

 Vazhiyorakazchakal
 Unni Vanna Divasam
 Adharvam
 Vachanam
 Randam Varavu
 Aayushkalam
 Gandhari
 Kanchanam
 Guru
 War and Love
 Hai
 Raghuvinte Swantham Raziya

Tamil

 Uthiripookkal
 Nenjathai Killathe
 Nizhalgal
 Moondru Mugam
 Rani Theni
 Agni Sakshi
 Oorukku Upadesam 
 Vikram
 Raja Mariyadhai
 Meendum Oru Kaathal Kathai
 Vedham Pudhithu
 Paasa Paravaigal
 Thalapathi
 Anbu Sangili
 Nattukku Oru Nallavan
 Veera
 Thendral Varum Theru
 Jai Hind
 Rajavin Parvaiyile 
 Kaadhale Nimmadhi
 Velai
 Dhill
 Thamizhan
 Pon Megalai
 Karka Kasadara
 Yuga
 Uthamaputhiran
 Sillunu Oru Sandhippu
 Saithan
 Odu Raja Odu
 Dha Dha 87
 Haraa

Telugu

 Mathru Devo Bhava
 Surya IPS
 Neti Siddhartha
 Nirnayam 
 Ankuram 
 Subhodhayam
 Mounam
 Naa Peru Surya, Naa Illu India'
 Venky Mama JamadagniDear ComradeGamanamDirectorPudhiya Sangamam (1982)IPC 215 (2003)

Books
 His book, Thinking on my Feet : Charuhasan Autobiography published by LiFi Publications, New Delhi under the imprint Biog'' has been released during the New Delhi World Book Fair, 2015.

References

External links
 
 Autobiography of Charuhasan
 27 October 1998, Rediff
 9 April 2009, The Hindu
 9 July 2002, The Hindu
 Journalists' forum call to combat campaign against actresses, 24 November 2005, The Hindu
 When the living was easy, 1 April 2009, The Hindu
 , 26 August 2004, The Hindu
 Candour, Charuhasan style, 23 August 2012, The Hindu

Living people
Best Actor National Film Award winners
Male actors in Kannada cinema
1930 births
Male actors from Tamil Nadu
Indian amateur radio operators
Filmfare Awards South winners
People from Ramanathapuram district
Male actors in Malayalam cinema
Indian male film actors
20th-century Indian male actors
Male actors in Tamil cinema
Tamil male television actors